Branche or la Branche is a surname. Notable people with the surname include:

 Alcée Louis la Branche (1806–1861), American politician
 George Branche (born 1953), Sierra Leonean middle-distance runner
 Derrick Branche (born 1947), British actor
 Stanley Branche (1933–1992), American civil rights activist

See also
Coudekerque-Branche, a commune of Nord department, France
Branch (disambiguation)